Donald William Bishop (July 1, 1934November 13, 1998) was an American football cornerback in the National Football League for the Dallas Cowboys, Pittsburgh Steelers and Chicago Bears. He played college football at Los Angeles City College.

Early years
Bishop was born on July 1, 1934 in Rawlings, Virginia. He attended Jefferson High School. He moved on to Los Angeles City College, where he was a two-way End and earned Junior College All-American honors.

Professional career

Pittsburgh Steelers
Bishop was signed as an undrafted free agent by the Pittsburgh Steelers after the 1958 NFL Draft. He was tried at split end and as a halfback, catching only 3 passes in his rookie season. In his second year, he was used at defensive halfback and punt returner, but was released after 2 games on October 12, because of poor performances.

Chicago Bears
The Chicago Bears claimed him off waivers during the 1959 season, but played him in only one game.

Dallas Cowboys
On September 6, 1960, the expansion Dallas Cowboys claimed him off waivers. Bishop was switched to cornerback and during the Cowboys' 1960 inaugural year, he became the franchise first starting right cornerback, registering 71 tackles, 13 passes defensed and 3 interceptions in a 12-game season, tying him with Tom Franckhauser for the team lead.

In 1961, he began to stand out, finishing with 8 interceptions in a 14-game season, which trailed league leader Dick Lynch by one. Only Everson Walls (twice) and Mel Renfro (once), have had more interceptions in a season for the Cowboys. He also established a team record that still stands today, with five consecutive games with an interception. That year Bishop did not make the Pro Bowl, but was named to the 1961 Sporting News: First-team All-NFL.

In 1962, he had 6 interceptions and also scored his lone career touchdown, returning an interception 84 yards in a loss to the Los Angeles Rams. After missing the Pro Bowl the previous season, Bishop was one of the first Cowboys players ever to receive this honor. Other teammates that joined him in the Pro Bowl that season were: QB Eddie LeBaron; DT Bob Lilly; RB Don Perkins; and LB Jerry Tubbs.

In 1963, he recorded 5 interceptions, making him the Cowboys leader in interceptions during their first four years of existence.

A knee injury forced him to have surgery before the 1964 season, which would limit him the rest of his career. He started 7 games at right cornerback, while alternating with Warren Livingston. In 1965, he was a backup behind Livingston and retired at the end of the season. 

Bishop played 8 seasons in the NFL, leaving as the Cowboys career interceptions leader. His 22 interceptions ranks eleventh on the current franchise career interceptions list. The Cowboys have had several great cornerbacks since then, but Bishop's contributions to the franchise must be remembered. Although he played on some of the Cowboys worst teams, he became one of their original defensive stars.

Personal life
Bishop at one point worked as a morticians' assistant during the off-season.

References

External links
The 50 Greatest Players in Silver Stars History

1934 births
1998 deaths
Players of American football from Los Angeles
American football defensive backs
Los Angeles City Cubs football players
Pittsburgh Steelers players
Chicago Bears players
Dallas Cowboys players
Eastern Conference Pro Bowl players
Jefferson High School (Los Angeles) alumni